Oppenheimer is a biographical miniseries in seven parts about J. Robert Oppenheimer, produced by the BBC. It was broadcast in the United Kingdom between 29 October and 10 December 1980, and in the United States from 11 May 1982 as a component of PBS' Masterpiece Theatre. The series stars Sam Waterston as Oppenheimer.

Plot synopsis
The series depicts Oppenheimer's wartime role as head of the weapons laboratory of the Manhattan Project, during which he was under constant surveillance by the federal government because of his association with Communists. It culminates in a U.S. Atomic Energy Commission hearing in 1954, in which Oppenheimer is stripped of his security clearance.

Cast
 Sam Waterston as J. Robert Oppenheimer
 John Carson as Narrator
 Christopher Muncke as Colonel Kenneth Nichols
 Jana Shelden as Kitty Oppenheimer
 Kate Harper as Jean Tatlock
 Edward Hardwicke as Enrico Fermi
 David Suchet as Edward Teller
 Manning Redwood as Lieutenant General Leslie Groves
 Peter Whitman as Robert Serber
 Matthew Guinness as Hans Bethe
 Bob Sherman as Ernest Lawrence
 John Morton as Robert Wilson
 Garrick Hagon as Frank Oppenheimer
 Liza Ross as Jackie Oppenheimer
 Barry Dennen as Isidor Rabi
 Peter Marinker as Haakon Chevalier
 Sarah Brackett as Priscilla Duffield

Reception
Television critic John J. O'Connor wrote in The New York Times that Oppenheimer was "persuasively" played by Waterston, and that "the production is primarily interested in telling, quite absorbingly, one of the more puzzling and indeed astonishing stories of contemporary American history. Baltimore Sun TV critic Bill Carter called it "never less than a fascinating portrait of a truly fascinating man." while criticizing a "choppy production technique that makes much of the film seem rather raw."

The series was nominated for seven BAFTA Television Awards and won three (Best Drama Series/Serial, Best Film Editor (Tariq Anwar), and Best Original Television Music (Carl Davis)). It was nominated for two Emmy Awards, for Outstanding Limited Series and for Outstanding Writing in a Limited Series or a Special (Peter Prince). It was nominated for a Golden Globe Award for Best Performance by an Actor in a Mini-Series or Motion Picture Made for TV (Sam Waterston).

Major General Kenneth Nichols disputed his portrayal in the series, saying that it "portrayed me serving as a personal aide to Groves on frequent visits to Los Alamos," when he only did so once.

References

External links
 

1980 British television series debuts
1980 British television series endings
1980s British drama television series
BAFTA winners (television series)
BBC television docudramas
1980s British television miniseries
Cultural depictions of J. Robert Oppenheimer
Television series about the Manhattan Project
Science docudramas
English-language television shows
Television shows about the atomic bombings of Hiroshima and Nagasaki
American Playhouse